Gladiolus 'Rose Supreme' is a cultivar of Gladiolus which features warm salmon flowers with creamy hearts. These eye-catching ruffled blossoms are arranged closely and symmetrically on strong and erect spikes adorned by pointed sword-like leaves.

See also 
 List of Gladiolus varieties

Rose Supreme
Ornamental plant cultivars